The  is an electric multiple unit (EMU) train type operated by Kita-Osaka Kyuko Railway ("Kitakyu") on the Kitakyu Namboku Line in north Osaka since April 2014.

Formation
, two ten-car sets are in operation, formed as shown below, with four motored ("M") cars and six non-powered trailer ("T") cars, and car 1 at the Senri-Chuo end.

Interior
Passenger accommodation consists of longitudinal bench seating with "golden olive" green moquette seat covers.
LED lighting is used throughout. Each car includes a wheelchair space.

History
The first set entered revenue service on 28 April 2014. The third set, 9003, entered service on 27 February 2016. This set features a full-body brown and cream vinyl wrapping livery.

An additional three sets were ordered in 2021 to compliment the opening of the Namboku Line extension to Minō-Kayano Station which is scheduled to open by the end of 2023.

Fleet history
The build details for the fleet are as shown below.

References

External links

  

Electric multiple units of Japan
Train-related introductions in 2014
750 V DC multiple units
Kinki Sharyo multiple units